Lochaber is a township municipality in the Canadian province of Quebec, located within the Papineau Regional County Municipality. The township had a population of 415 in the 2016 Canadian Census.

History
In 1807,  a group of Scots settled in the southern part of the Blanche River valley, the same year the geographic township of Lochaber Gore was created. They came from Thurso in Scotland, as well as from the Highlands, near Lochaber and other parts of northern Scotland.

In 1845, the township municipality was formed but abolished in September 1847 when it became part of Ottawa County. In 1855, it was reestablished.

In 1886, the village municipality of Thurso separated from the township, and in 1891, the western half the township was split off to form the township municipality of Lochaber-Partie-Ouest.

Demographics 

Mother tongue:
 English as first language: 7.2%
 French as first language: 89.2%
 English and French as first language: 0%
 Other as first language: 2.4%

References

External links

Township municipalities in Quebec
Incorporated places in Outaouais